Cold Is the Grave  is the 11th novel by Anglo-Canadian detective fiction writer Peter Robinson in the Inspector Banks series, published in 2000. It won the 2001 Arthur Ellis Award for Best Crime Novel, and the Danish Palle Rosenkrantz Award.

Adaptations
In 2011, an episode of the ITV series DCI Banks, that was based on the events in Cold is the Grave, was broadcast. The series has Stephen Tompkinson as its lead actor in the Banks role.

References

External links
Dedicated page on author's website

2000 Canadian novels
Novels by Peter Robinson (novelist)
Novels set in Yorkshire
Novels set in London
Viking Press books